Vincenzo D'Amico (5 November 1954) is an Italian former association football player who played as a midfielder or forward. In all, he played seventeen seasons in Italian professional soccer, mostly for S.S. Lazio.

In 1985, D'Amico played for the New York Cosmos in a friendly match against Lazio in Giants Stadium in New Jersey -- Giorgio Chinaglia, who owned both clubs, assigned D'Amico to the New York roster. Lazio won, 2–1, with D'Amico scoring the only goal for New York; it turned out to be the last goal in the history of the original Cosmos, as the club folded soon thereafter.

Honours
S.S. Lazio
 Serie A: 1973–74

External links
 Vincenzo D'Amico at Gol Calcio

Living people
1954 births
Italian footballers
Association football midfielders
Serie A players
Serie B players
Serie C players
S.S. Lazio players
Torino F.C. players
Ternana Calcio players